Julie Kedzie (born March 18, 1981) is a retired American mixed martial artist. She is a third degree black belt in Tae Kwon Do and specializes in Brazilian Jiu-Jitsu. Kedzie was Greg Jackson's personal assistant at Jackson's Mixed Martial Arts. Kedzie has been working for Invicta Fighting Championships as a fight commentator and interviewer. In December 2013, Kedzie became the new matchmaker for Invicta FC.

Early life
Kedzie was born in Chicago, Illinois and moved to Bloomington, Indiana when she was twelve so her mother could pursue a doctorate in neurobiology from Indiana University. Her sister is the geneticist Jennifer Raff.

She and her sister were enrolled in Tae Kwon Do by her father when Julie was five years old.

She studied under Steve and Linda Scott at Monroe County Martial Arts. She later returned to teach a one-time mixed martial arts class.

She has a Bachelor of Arts in English Literature from Indiana University.

She graduated with a Masters of Fine Arts in Nonfiction Writing from the University of Iowa in 2019.

Mixed martial arts career

Early career
Kedzie rose to prominence in mixed martial arts on November 19, 2005, when she won the one-night HOOKnSHOOT Women's Grand Prix in Evansville, Indiana.

EliteXC
On February 10, 2007, Kedzie faced undefeated rising star Gina Carano in a featured bout at EliteXC: Destiny, which aired live on Showtime. She was defeated by Carano, but the fight received Fight of the Night honours.

Independent promotions
Following the Elite XC fight, Kedzie defeated Kelly Kobold at BodogFight - Vancouver on August 24, 2007. She won the fight by unanimous decision.

Kedzie later signed a contract with the American Fight League, but the promotion folded and Kedzie was released from her contract.

Jackson's MMA Series
Kedzie was scheduled to face Sarah D'Alelio at Jackson's MMA Series 2 on September 4, 2010, but the fight was canceled after Kedzie signed on to take part in the filming of the Ultimate Women Challenge reality show. The show never made it to air, and 7 contestants sued the producers, claiming they were never paid.

During the filming of the Ultimate Women Challenge, Kedzie faced Kaitlin Young on September 24, 2010. She was defeated by split decision.

Kedzie's fight with Sarah D'Alelio was then rebooked for Jackson's MMA Series 3 on December 18, 2010 in Albuquerque, New Mexico. She defeated D'Alelio via unanimous decision.

She then faced Kaitlin Young in a five-round title rematch at Jackson's MMA Series 4 on April 9, 2011. Kedzie defeated Young by unanimous decision to become Jackson's MMA Series Women's Bantamweight Champion.

Strikeforce
Kedzie was scheduled to fight Amanda Nunes at the Strikeforce: Overeem vs. Werdum event on June 18, 2011, in Dallas, Texas.  The bout, however, was cancelled after Nunes sustained a foot injury.

Kedzie made her Strikeforce debut against Alexis Davis on July 30, 2011 at Strikeforce: Fedor vs. Henderson in Hoffman Estates, Illinois. She lost the fight via unanimous decision.

Kedzie was expected to face Germaine de Randamie as part of the Strikeforce Challengers 19 card on September 23, 2011, but withdrew due to injury.

Kedzie faced Miesha Tate at Strikeforce: Rousey vs. Kaufman on August 18, 2012. She was defeated by submission due to an armbar in the third round.

Ultimate Fighting Championship
Kedzie's UFC debut was against Germaine de Randamie at UFC on Fox 8 on July 27, 2013. She lost the fight by split decision.

Kedzie faced Bethe Correia at UFC Fight Night: Hunt vs. Bigfoot on December 7, 2013. She lost the fight via split decision and subsequently announced her retirement from mixed martial arts competition via Twitter.

Kedzie announced that she is officially retired on April 24, 2021 via Twitter.

Mixed martial arts record

|-
| Loss
| align=center| 16–13 
| Bethe Correia
| Decision (split)
| UFC Fight Night: Hunt vs. Bigfoot
| 
| align=center| 3
| align=center| 5:00
| Brisbane, Queensland, Australia
| 
|-
| Loss
| align=center| 16–12
| Germaine de Randamie
| Decision (split)
| UFC on Fox: Johnson vs. Moraga
| 
| align=center| 3
| align=center| 5:00
| Seattle, Washington, United States
| 
|-
| Loss
| align=center| 16–11
| Miesha Tate
| Submission (armbar)
| Strikeforce: Rousey vs. Kaufman
| 
| align=center| 3
| align=center| 3:28
| San Diego, California, United States
| 
|-
| Loss
| align=center| 16–10
| Alexis Davis
| Decision (unanimous)
| Strikeforce: Fedor vs. Henderson
| 
| align=center| 3
| align=center| 5:00
| Hoffman Estates, Illinois, United States
| 
|-
| Win
| align=center| 16–9
| Kaitlin Young
| Decision (unanimous)
| Jackson's MMA Series 4
| 
| align=center| 5
| align=center| 5:00
| Albuquerque, New Mexico, United States
| 
|-
| Win
| align=center| 15–9
| Sarah D'Alelio
| Decision (unanimous)
| Jackson's MMA Series 3
| 
| align=center| 3
| align=center| 5:00
| Albuquerque, New Mexico, United States
| 
|-
| Loss
| align=center | 14–9
| Kaitlin Young
| Decision (split)
| Ultimate Women Challenge
| 
| align=center | 3
| align=center | 3:00
| St. George, Utah, United States
| 
|-
| Win
| align=center| 14–8
| Malissa Sherwood
| Decision (unanimous)
| Jackson's MMA Series 1
| 
| align=center| 3
| align=center| 5:00
| Albuquerque, New Mexico, United States
| 
|-
| Win
| align=center| 13–8
| Katrina Alendal
| Decision (unanimous)
| Cage Life: Ultimate Freedom Throwdown   	
| 
| align=center| 3
| align=center| 5:00
| Albuquerque, New Mexico, United States
| 
|-
| Loss
| align=center| 12–8
| Sarah Schneider
| Submission (rear-naked choke)
| Duke City MMA Series 1 
| 
| align=center| 1
| align=center| 2:01
| Albuquerque, New Mexico, United States
| 
|-
| Win
| align=center| 12–7
| Angela Hayes
| Submission (armbar)
| Battlequest 8
| 
| align=center| 1
| align=center| 4:26
| Denver, Colorado, United States
| 
|-
| Loss
| align=center| 11–7
| Tonya Evinger
| Submission (rear-naked choke)
| ShoXC: Elite Challenger Series
| 
| align=center| 1
| align=center| 1:43
| Atlantic City, New Jersey, United States
| 
|-
| Win
| align=center| 11–6
| Jan Finney
| TKO (punches)
| HOOKnSHOOT: MW Tournament
| 
| align=center| 2
| align=center| 2:44
| Evansville, Indiana, United States
|
|-
| Win
| align=center| 10–6
| Kelly Kobold
| Decision (unanimous)
| BodogFight: Vancouver
| 
| align=center| 3
| align=center| 5:00
| Vancouver, British Columbia, Canada
| 
|-
| Win
| align=center| 9–6
| Julia Berezikova
| TKO (punches)
| BodogFight: Clash of the Nations
| 
| align=center| 2
| align=center| 2:49
| St. Petersburg, Russia
| 
|-
| Loss
| align=center| 8–6
| Gina Carano
| Decision (unanimous)
| EliteXC: Destiny
| 
| align=center| 3
| align=center| 3:00
| Southaven, Mississippi, United States
| 
|-
| Loss
| align=center| 8–5
| Amanda Buckner
| Submission (guillotine choke)
| BodogFight: St. Petersburg
| 
| align=center| 1
| align=center| 2:21
| St. Petersburg, Russia
| 
|-
| Win
| align=center| 8–4
| Molly Helsel
| Decision (majority)
| HOOKnSHOOT: The Women Return
| 
| align=center| 3
| align=center| 5:00
| Evansville, Indiana, United States
| 
|-
| Win
| align=center| 7–4
| Jan Finney
| Decision (unanimous)
| KOTC: Meltdown
| 
| align=center| 2
| align=center| 5:00
| Indianapolis, Indiana, United States
| 
|-
| Loss
| align=center| 6–4
| Tara LaRosa
| Decision (unanimous)
| Ultimate Cage Wars
| 
| align=center| 3
| align=center| 5:00
| Chelan, Washington, United States
| 
|-
| Win
| align=center| 6–3
| Amanda Duvall
| TKO (punches)
| Cage Rage Indiana
| 
| align=center| 1
| align=center| 0:18
| Indiana, United States
| 
|-
| Win
| align=center| 5–3
| Sasha Mrvic
| Decision (unanimous)
| Combat Do Fighting Challenge 7
| 
| align=center| 3
| align=center| 5:00
| Cicero, Illinois, United States
| 
|-
| Loss
| align=center| 4–3
| Shayna Baszler
| Submission (armbar)
| Freestyle Combat Challenge 22
| 
| align=center| 1
| align=center| N/A
| Racine, Wisconsin, United States
| 
|-
| Win
| align=center| 4–2
| Molly Helsel
| Decision (split)
| HOOKnSHOOT: 2005 Women's Grand Prix
| 
| align=center| 3
| align=center| 5:00
| Evansville, Indiana, United States
| 
|-
| Win
| align=center| 3–2
| Jan Finney
| Decision (unanimous)
| HOOKnSHOOT: 2005 Women's Grand Prix
| 
| align=center| 3
| align=center| 5:00
| Evansville, Indiana, United States
| 
|-
| Win
| align=center| 2–2
| Missy Karr
| Submission (keylock)
| HOOKnSHOOT: 2005 Women's Grand Prix
| 
| align=center| 1
| align=center| N/A
| Evansville, Indiana, United States
| 
|-
| Loss
| align=center| 1–2
| Jen Case
| Submission (triangle choke)
| HOOKnSHOOT: Arnold Classic
| 
| align=center| 2
| align=center| 2:11
| Columbus, Ohio, United States
| 
|-
| Loss
| align=center| 1–1
| Jen Case
| Submission (armbar)
| HOOKnSHOOT: Evolution
| 
| align=center| 1
| align=center| 2:51
| Evansville, Indiana, United States
| 
|-
| Win
| align=center| 1–0
| Terry Blair
| Submission (armbar)
| HOOKnSHOOT: Live
| 
| align=center| 2
| align=center| 2:13
| Evansville, Indiana, United States
| 
|}

HOOKnSHOOT - 2005 Women's Grand Prix Bracket
This tournament was held on November 19, 2005.

Accomplishments
 2005 HOOKnSHOOT Women's Grand Prix Champion
 Extreme Grappling Open Champion
 Jackson's MMA Series Women's Bantamweight Champion (2011)
BJPenn.com
2012 WMMA Fight of the Year vs. Miesha Tate on August 18

See also
List of female mixed martial artists

References

External links
 Julie Kedzie Awakening Profile
 
 
 Fightergirls.com profile
 Julie Kedzie's Official Website

1981 births
American practitioners of Brazilian jiu-jitsu
Female Brazilian jiu-jitsu practitioners
Indiana University alumni
Living people
Sportspeople from Bloomington, Indiana
American female mixed martial artists
American female taekwondo practitioners
Bantamweight mixed martial artists
Mixed martial artists utilizing taekwondo
Mixed martial artists utilizing Muay Thai
Mixed martial artists utilizing Brazilian jiu-jitsu
21st-century American women
Ultimate Fighting Championship female fighters